The 2021 Omloop Het Nieuwsblad was a road cycling one-day race that took place on 27 February 2021 in Belgium, starting in Gent and finishing in Ninove. It was the 76th edition of the Omloop Het Nieuwsblad and the second event of the 2021 UCI World Tour.

The Omloop Het Nieuwsblad is a race that is usually won by a solo rider or is decided by a sprint from a small group of several riders. However, this year, the good weather and the race conditions contributed to a comparatively large group of over 50 riders that contested the final sprint.  led from the front as their lead-out train, including current World Road Race champion Julian Alaphilippe, tried to set up in-form sprinter Davide Ballerini for the win. In the ensuing sprint, Ballerini won easily, having not been troubled by any of the other sprinters. Behind him, neo-pro Jake Stewart slipped past 2012 winner Sep Vanmarcke along the barriers to take second. For his part, Vanmarcke held off Heinrich Haussler with the bike throw on the line to secure third, that being the former's third third-place result in the race after back-to-back third places in 2017 and 2018.

Teams 
Twenty-five teams participated in the race, including all nineteen UCI WorldTour teams and six UCI ProTeams. Each team entered seven riders for a total of 175 riders, of which 140 finished.

UCI WorldTeams

 
 
 
 
 
 
 
 
 
 
 
 
 
 
 
 
 
 
 

UCI ProTeams

Result

References

External links
 

2021 UCI World Tour
2021
Omloop Het Nieuwsblad
Omloop Het Nieuwsblad